The  was a type of 4-4-0 steam locomotive used on Japanese Government Railways. The two locomotives, numbered 18 and 20, were built by Kitson and Company in the United Kingdom in 1874 as 0-6-0 locomotives of the later JGR Class 7010. They were rebuilt into 4-4-0 wheel arrangement passenger locomotives at Kobe in 1876. In 1909, the two locomotives were classified Class 5100, becoming numbers 5100 and 5101.

See also
 Japan Railways locomotive numbering and classification

References

4-4-0 locomotives
Steam locomotives of Japan
1067 mm gauge locomotives of Japan
Scrapped locomotives

ja:国鉄7010形蒸気機関車#5100形
Passenger locomotives